Henry Tate was an English sugar merchant and philanthropist.

Henry Tate may also refer to:

Henry Tate (poet) (1873–1926), Australian poet and musician
Henry Tate (cricketer) (1849–1936), English cricketer
Henry W. Tate (died 1914), oral historian from the Tsimshian First Nation in British Columbia, Canada
J. Henry Tate (1830–?), American politician in Wisconsin

See also
Harry Tate (disambiguation)